The 1996 African Cup of Champions Clubs Final was a football tie held over two legs in December 1996 between Shooting Stars, and Zamalek.

Zamalek from Egypt won that final, became the 1st African team to win Cup of Champions for fourth time.

Match details

First leg

Second leg

Notes and references

 http://www.angelfire.com/ak/EgyptianSports/ZamalekAfr1996.html

External links

1996 African Cup of Champions Clubs
African Cup of Champions Clubs Finals
1
CCL
ACCC
1996–97 in Egyptian football
1996–97 in Nigerian football
CAF Champions League Final 1996